Fourstones is a village in Northumberland, England.

Landmarks  
Newbrough and Fourstones are on the Stanegate Roman road, built in AD 71, which runs from east to west and formed the original northern frontier before the building of Hadrian's Wall. Newbrough's church stands on the site of one of the line of forts along this road.

Fourstones was the site of the first official Boy Scouts camp held by Lord Baden-Powell in 1908. The camp was at Carr Edge Farm and a monument stands in the woods nearby.

See also
 Stanegate

References

External links

Village website (Fourstones & Newbrough) (accessed: 20 November 2008)
Northumberland Communities (Accessed: 10 November 2008)

Villages in Northumberland